Irimiás Gergő István (born 8 September 2001) is a Hungarian footballer who currently plays as a midfielder for Honvéd.

Career statistics

Club

References

2001 births
Living people
Hungarian footballers
Association football midfielders
Nemzeti Bajnokság I players
Budapest Honvéd FC players
FC Ajka players